Fred Marshall, (March 13, 1906 – June 5, 1985), was a member of the United States House of Representatives from the U.S. state of Minnesota.

Marshall born in Union Grove Township, near Grove City, Meeker County, Minnesota; graduated from Paynesville, Minnesota High School; engaged in farming; member of the Minnesota Agriculture Administration Committee, 1937 – 1941; State director of the Farm Security Administration (later the Farmers Home Administration) 1941 – 1948; delegate, Minnesota Democratic-Farmer-Labor Party (DFL) convention, 1966.

Marshall was elected as a DFL member to the 81st, 82nd, 83rd, 84th, 85th, 86th, and 87th congresses, (January 3, 1949 – January 3, 1963); was not a candidate for reelection in 1962 to the 88th congress; resumed agriculture pursuits; member, National Commission on Food Marketing; member, United States Department of Agriculture Forest Appeals Board.

Marshall was a resident of Grove City, Minnesota, until his death in Litchfield, Minnesota, on June 5, 1985 and was interred in Burr Oak Cemetery on the family farm in Union Grove Township, Meeker County.

External links

1906 births
1985 deaths
People from Meeker County, Minnesota
Democratic Party members of the United States House of Representatives from Minnesota
20th-century American politicians